List of works by or about American author Louise Erdrich.

Novels

 The Crown of Columbus [coauthored with Michael Dorris] (1991)
 The Antelope Wife (1998), revised and published as Antelope Woman (2016)
 The Master Butchers Singing Club (2003) , 
 Shadow Tag (Harper, 2010)
 Future Home of the Living God (2017)
 The Night Watchman (2020)
The Sentence (2021)

Love Medicine series
 Love Medicine (1984) , 
 The Beet Queen (1986) , 
 Tracks (1988)
 The Bingo Palace (1994)
 Tales of Burning Love (1997) , 
 The Last Report on the Miracles at Little No Horse (2001) , 
 Four Souls (2004)
 The Painted Drum (2005)

Justice trilogy
 The Plague of Doves (2008)
 The Round House (2012)
 LaRose (2016)

Short fiction
Collections
 The Red Convertible: Collected and New Stories 1978-2008 (2009)
Stories

Children's literature
 Grandmother's Pigeon (1996)
 The Range Eternal (2002)

The Birchbark series
 The Birchbark House (1999)
 The Game of Silence (2005)
 The Porcupine Year (2008)
 Chickadee (2012)
 Makoons (2016)

Poetry
 Jacklight (1984)
 Baptism of Desire (1989)
 Original Fire: Selected and New Poems (2003)

Non-fiction
 Route Two [coauthored with Michael Dorris] (1990)
 The Blue Jay's Dance: A Birthyear (1995) , 
 "Two Languages in Mind, But Just One in the Heart" (2000)
 Books and Islands in Ojibwe Country (2003)

As editor or contributor
 The Broken Cord by Michael Dorris (Foreword) (1989)
 The Best American Short Stories 1993 (Editor, with Katrina Kenison) (1993)
 Ghost Fishing: An Eco-Justice Poetry Anthology (Contributing poet, edited by Melissa Tuckey) (University of Georgia Press, 2018)

Critical studies and reviews of Erdrich's work
 
 
 
 
 
 
 
 
 
 
Interviews
 Conversations with Louise Erdrich and Michael Dorris, ed.  Allan Chavkin and Nancy Feyl Chavkin (Mississippi UP, 1994)
 Louise Erdrich, The Art of Fiction No. 208 Interview with Louise Erdrich by Lisa Halliday in The Paris Review

Notes

Bibliographies by writer
Bibliographies of American writers